Songs of Repression is a 2020 documentary film about the German colony Villa Baviera in Chile. The film premiered at 2020 the Copenhagen International Documentary Festival, where it won the Politiken:Danish:Dox Award and the CPH:DOX Award.

References

External links 
 

2020 documentary films
2020 films
Colonia Dignidad
Danish documentary films
2020s German-language films